Laura Lee Forese is an American pediatric orthopedic surgeon and hospital administrator. She is the Executive Vice-President and COO of NewYork-Presbyterian Hospital/Weill Cornell Medical Center.

Biography
As an undergrad at Princeton University, Forese majored in Civil Engineering and Operations Research, but retained an interest in studying medicine. She graduated summa cum laude in 1983 and was a member of the Phi Beta Kappa honor society. She went on to study at Columbia University Vagelos College of Physicians and Surgeons, graduating in 1987, and was a member of Alpha Omega Alpha. At Columbia Presbyterian, she did her internship in general surgery and her residency in orthopedic surgery.

In 1993, she joined Helen Hayes Hospital and later became chief of surgery and anesthesia services She also continued as a faculty member at Columbia University. She received a Master of Public Health in Health Services Management from Columbia University Mailman School of Public Health in 1995. From 1998 to 2002, she was vice chair in the Department of Orthopaedic Surgery at Columbia.

She joined NewYork-Presbyterian Hospital/Weill Cornell Medical Center in 2003 as the vice president of medical affairs. In 2005, she became the chief medical officer and senior vice president, and in 2006 she was also appointed the role of chief operating officer. In 2013, she became president of the NewYork-Presbyterian Healthcare System. In October 2015, following a reorganization of the group, she returned to NewYork-Presbyterian/Weill Cornell as the executive vice president and chief operating officer.

In 2019, Crain’s New York Business listed Forese at number 9 on their list of fifty Most Powerful Women in New York.

In May 2022, Forese announced she was going to retire from her COO duties in June 2023. She is to be succeeded by Brian Donley. A 2019 salary survey indicated she was the second-highest compensated executive in the hospital with a salary of $5,286,445.

Other ventures 
In 2015, Forese joined the board of trustees at Princeton University, where she is serving an eight-year term. She was also on the board of directors for Cantel Medical Corporation prior to its acquisition by Steris. In 2016, a major restructuring at the National Institutes of Health Clinical Center, resulted in her appointment as chairman of their Research Hospital Board.

In 2018, she joined the inaugural board for the Mother Cabrini Health Foundation. In 2021, she became a board member on the Shubert Organization which does theater production. She also joined the board on medical treatments company Nereid Therapeutics.

Personal life 
She married physician Robert Downey in 1988 when they were both residents at Presbyterian Hospital. They have three children. They lived in Franklin Lakes, New Jersey. In 2016, the American Cancer Society honored her as a Mother of the Year.

References

Living people
Date of birth missing (living people)
Place of birth missing (living people)
21st-century American women physicians
21st-century American physicians
American hospital administrators
Princeton University School of Engineering and Applied Science alumni
Columbia University Vagelos College of Physicians and Surgeons alumni
Columbia University Mailman School of Public Health alumni
21st-century American businesswomen
21st-century American businesspeople
NewYork–Presbyterian Hospital physicians
American chief operating officers
American women business executives
Businesspeople from New York City
Physicians from New York City
American orthopedic surgeons
American pediatric surgeons
Year of birth missing (living people)